Jose Yumang Sonza (born September 20, 1955), also known as Jay Sonza, is a Filipino former newscaster and talk show host. He was the former station manager of the terrestrial television station UNTV 37 from 2004 to 2009.

Programs
 Get it Straight (2008–2010) (UNTV)
 Ito Ang Balita (2007–2010) (UNTV)
 Hataw Balita (Primetime) (2007) (UNTV)
 Pilipinas, Gising Ka Na Ba? (2005–2007) (UNTV)
 Balitang Balita (2000-2001) (ABC)
 Saksi (1998–1999) (GMA Network)
 Partners Mel and Jay (1996–2004) (GMA Network)
 Tapatan with Jay Sonza Radio Edition (1995–2010) (DZBB Bisig Bayan 594/DZRH 666 kHz/DZXL RMN 558 kHz/DZIQ Radyo Inquirer 990 AM)
 Tapatan with Jay Sonza (1995–1998; 2000–2001; 2004–2005) (GMA Network/RPN/UNTV)
 Pulis, Pulis Kung Umaksiyon, Mabilis (1993–1995) (DZMM 630: Ang Himpilan ng Malayang Mamamayan)
 Mel & Jay sa DZMM (1988–1996) (DZMM 630: Ang Himpilan ng Malayang Mamamayan)
 Mel & Jay (1989–1996) (ABS-CBN)
 Dear Deejay Jay (1981–1985) (DZMB 90.7)

Political career
In 2004, Jay filed his candidacy for Senator under Aksyon Demokratiko. He lost in the said elections but became the head of UNTV 37 the year after his electoral loss.

In 2007, he was one of the nominees of BATAS party-list. In 2010, he filed his candidacy for the Vice President for the 2010 election. He ran under the Kilusang Bagong Lipunan but lost.

Awards and nominations

See also
 Mel Tiangco

References

1955 births
Living people
Filipino radio journalists
Filipino television journalists
Filipino reporters and correspondents
Filipino television talk show hosts
ABS-CBN personalities
ABS-CBN News and Current Affairs people
GMA Network personalities
GMA Integrated News and Public Affairs people
RPN News and Public Affairs people
Candidates in the 2010 Philippine vice-presidential election
Aksyon Demokratiko politicians
Kilusang Bagong Lipunan politicians
De La Salle University alumni
Kapampangan people
People from Pampanga